Roop Tera Mastana ( Your beauty is intoxicating) is a 1972 Hindi-language thriller film, produced by Baldev Pushkarna and M.M. Malhotra under the Suchitra Kala Mandir banner and directed by Khalid Akhtar. It stars Jeetendra, Mumtaz, Pran in lead roles and music composed by Laxmikant Pyarelal.

Plot
The film begins with the cold-blooded murder of Usha, Princess (Mumtaz) of a royal dynasty by her cut-throat secretary Ajith Singh (Pran). Then, he conspires by snaring an ingénue Kiran (again Mumtaz) one that resembles the princess. He intimidates her, purports as Usha, and confines her to act until the princess's birthday. Since then, she will be the heir of the dynasty. Raj Kumar (Jeetendra) prince of another royal dynasty who is the fiancé’ of Usha arrives and observes a change in her but she somehow muddles through. On the eve of the birthday, Ajith learns that according to the testament Usha is unable to get the privilege until her wedding. Thus, he makes Kiran admit to wedlock with Kumar by menacing. Raja Saab (again Jeetendra) father of Kumar, splendidly performs their marriage. After a while, Kiran starts truly loving Kumar she tries to get away from Ajith's hoods, but in vain. Besides, an unknown suspicion begins in Kumar starts digging, when Ajith underhand slays and assumes him as dead. Knowing it, angered Kiran seeks to kill Ajith, in that mishap she loses her memory. Here, Kumar gamely returns in the guise of Raja Saab, recovers Kiran, and understands her virtue. He also breaks out the mystery by finding the dead body of Usha which is preserved. At last, Kumar ceases Ajith and saves Kiran. Finally, the movie ends on a happy note.

Cast
Jeetendra as Raja Sahib / Rajkumar (Double Role)
Mumtaz as Princess Usha / Kiran (Double Role)
Pran as Ajit
I. S. Johar as CID Inspector
Malika as Champa	
Brahm Bhardwaj	as Kiran's Father
Leela Mishra as Kiran's Mother 
Jankidas as Auctioneer

Soundtrack

External links 
 

1972 films
1970s Hindi-language films
Films scored by Laxmikant–Pyarelal